Rangdari  is an upcoming action film starring Gaurav Chopra, Kajal Yadav, Manjul Aasim, Mushtaq Khan, Kiran Kumar, Shakti Kapoor, and others.

Synopsis
The film is about Taimur Ansaar, a criminal-cum-politician who rules the badlands of 6 states of North India. In his rise to power, his friendship with his good friend Brij Singh sours and the best of friends becomes the worst of enemies. In their fight to eliminate each other and stay in power, the two lose some of their near and dear ones. It wasn't just about staying in power but being the supreme player Rangdari. But irrespective of Taimur's profession, the common man looks upon him as a Messiah... a real life Robinhood who helps the needy.

Cast
 Gaurav Chopra as Taimur Ansaar
 Kajal Yadav as Shabana
 Manjul Aasim as Brij Singh
 Kiran Kumar as Galib Singh
 Ali Quli Mirza as Nankau
 Shakti Kapoor as Sukhdev Singh
 Mushtaq Khan as Bhaiya Jagtap
 Raju Mavani as Sadhu Singh

References

External links
 From ads to 70mm on The Telegraph

2013 films
2010s Hindi-language films
Films shot in Lucknow